County Buildings is a municipal facility in Whitegates, Wicklow, County Wicklow, Ireland.

History
Originally Wicklow County Council held its meetings in Wicklow Courthouse. The county council moved a new facility, known as County Buildings, in 1977. The new building was extended to take on a cruciform shape in 1999 and extended again to a design by the Building Design Partnership in 2006. A customer care unit, introducing touchscreen technology, was created in the foyer of the county buildings in spring 2019.

References

Buildings and structures in County Wicklow
Wicklow